The 1090s was a decade of the Julian Calendar which began on January 1, 1090, and ended on December 31, 1099.

Significant people
 Nizam al-Mulk
 Pope Urban II
 Al-Muqtadi caliph of Baghdad 
 Malik-Shah I Seljuk sultan

References